Serviceton railway station is located on the Western standard gauge line in Victoria, Australia, in the small town of Serviceton,  by rail from Melbourne. Opened in 1889, and closed in 1986, today it is leased to West Wimmera Shire Council for community group use.

History

The Adelaide-Wolseley line was extended from Bordertown in South Australia on 19 January 1887 coinciding with the opening of the line from Dimboola in Victoria.

The Premier of South Australia, John Downer, wrote to his Victorian equivalent, James Service, suggesting that the new border railway town and station be named Downer after him. Service wrote back and said that as it was in Victoria, it would be named Serviceton after himself, although at the time of construction the land was claimed by both colonies.

As Serviceton was the border station and train crews could only operate within their own state, crews and locomotives were changed between the South Australian Railways and Victorian Railways. A customs house/railway station was commissioned in 1887 with costs shared between the two colonies. The complex of 15 main rooms, including a large refreshment room, was completed in 1889.

With federation, customs roles finished in January 1901 although trains would continue to changes locomotives until the 1980s. 

On 7 September 1951, the westbound Overland service collided with its eastbound equivalent at the station, killing one person and destroying four A2 class locomotives.

In 1970, the station was listed by the National Trust of Victoria for its part in the border dispute. Victorian Railways DRC railcar services from Horsham to Serviceton ceased in December 1978. The refreshment rooms closed in 1981 and the station closed in 1986.

It ceased to be a crew changeover and train passing location in March 1984 after a new crossing loop opened at Dimboola. In 2011, the station building was restored by VicTrack and leased to West Wimmera Shire Council for community group use. Since then it has housed a display of local and railway memorabilia.

The Overland previously called at Serviceton on its journey between Adelaide and Melbourne, but no longer stops there.

In popular culture
American singer Tom Waits included the closure of the station in his song 'Town with no cheer', in his 1983 album Swordfishtrombones.

References

External links

Disused railway stations in Victoria (Australia)
Railway stations in Australia opened in 1889
Railway stations closed in 1986
Listed railway stations in Australia
Victorian Heritage Register Grampians (region)
Shire of West Wimmera